The United Nuclear Corporation (UNC) was a diversified nuclear mining, development, and applications company based out of the United States. Formed in 1961 as a joint venture between the Olin Mathieson Chemical Corporation, the Mallinckrodt Corporation of America, and the Nuclear Development Corporation of America, the company is most well known today as the company behind the Church Rock uranium mill spill. In 1996 the company was acquired by General Electric, and remains to oversee the decommissioning of its former sites.

History 
The United Nuclear Corporation was formed in 1961 to oversee its founding partner's existing nuclear projects and take advantage of the growing nuclear market in the context of the cold war. At formation, UNC began managing the Hematite, Missouri Production Plant and the New Haven Naval Products Plant previously owned by Mallinckrodt and Olin respectively. 

That year, the company announced the development of a nuclear "fast burst reactor" designed for use in research contexts. Later known as the Health Physics Research Reactor and located in the Oak Ridge National Laboratory, the reactor was completed on 31 May 1963. It was the first of its kind to depart from an unalloyed uranium metal assembly.  

The company purchased its first uranium mill, Ambrosia Lake, in 1963, and built a nuclear fuel recycling plant in 1964. The company also experienced its first nuclear incident that year when an operator at its recycling plant was killed by a criticality incident. In 1965 UNC won a contract from the Atomic Energy Commission to operate the reactor and fuel fabrication facilities at the AEC's plant. The company also attempted to merge with Pan American Sulphur, however the deal never came to fruition. The next year, in 1966, Cities Services Co attempted to enter the nuclear market through purchasing UNC, however, yet again, the deal was terminated.

On 13 February 1968 the company became publicly listed on the New York Stock Exchange, although the company had been an OTC stock before then. Shortly after, in June of that year, Combustion Engineering purchased 22% of UNC despite a majority of the UNC board indicating their opposition. In response, UNC brought an antitrust suit against CE and the company was forced to divest themselves of the stock.

During the 1970s the company saw a large expansion as it opened its Church Rock uranium mill in 1977 and moved to a new, larger Naval Products plant in Montville. In 1971, the company expanded into coal mining with the purchase of Plateau Mining. The company also entered a partnership with Gulf Oil to form the Gulf United Nuclear Fuels Corporation, although the company sold its interest to Gulf in 1973. By 1978 the company was the nation's largest independent producer of uranium. The next year, 1979, saw the company's second nuclear incident, when a dam at their Church Rock mine broke, leaking radioactive waste into a tributary of the Puerco River.

In 1984, following the decline of the uranium industry near the end of the cold war, the United Nuclear Corporation rebranded to "UNC" and transitioned over the next decade into a business aviation and jet engine service provider. With the purchase of Garrett Aviation Services in 1996, UNC controlled 52% of the business aviation services market and saw annual revenues of close to $1 billion. The next year, in 1997, General Electric acquired the company and its debts for $330 million, with The Carlyle Group purchasing its military contract services division, UNC Aviation Services.

Facilities

Ambrosia Lake Uranium Mill 

Ambrosia Lake was a uranium mine and mill built in 1957 and operated by the Phillips Petroleum Company until it was purchased by UNC in 1963. Shortly after, UNC ceased milling operations at the site, although they retained ownership of the property.

Church Rock Uranium Mill 

The Church Rock uranium mine and mill, located in McKinley County, New Mexico, first began exploration in 1968 as the company looked to expand its operations to meet demand. The mill was operational from June 1977 to May 1982. At around 5:30am on 16 July 1979, a 20ft breach opened in the south cell of the facility's uranium mill tailings pond, releasing 1,000 tonnes of solid radioactive mill waste and 93 million US gallons acidic, radioactive tailings solution into Pipeline Arroyo, a tributary of the Puerco River. In 1983 the site was added to the Environmental Protection Agency's the National Priorities List, following investigations and minor cleanup efforts in the previous four years. In 1997, following their purchase by General Electric, the Nuclear Regulatory Commission fined UNC $100,000 for failing to set aside funds for the decommission of the site. In 2008, a five-year plan for the cleanup of contaminated uranium sites on the Navajo reservation, of which Church Rock is part, was authorized.

Wood River Junction Fuels Recovery Plant 

The UNC Fuels Recovery Plant was a nuclear fuel recycling plant opened in April 1964. Four months after it began operation, on 24 July 1964 at 6:06pm a criticality incident occurred resulting in the death of the Production Operator, Robert Peabody, from acute radiation syndrome. Five other employees were in the facility at the time, however no other fatalities occurred. As a result of the incident, the Atomic Energy Commission charged UNC with 14 violations of nuclear safety regulations, however no fines were ever levied against the company. After decontamination, the plant reopened on 1965 and remained in operation until it was decommissioned in 1980. A 1979 aerial survey found radiation exposure rates in the area to be consistent with natural background radiation, except directly over the UNC facility.

New Haven & Montville Naval Products Plants 
UNC operated two facilities for the fabrication of nuclear products for the U.S Navy over its life. The original facility, located in New Haven, Connecticut, was built and operated by Olin Mathieson Chemicals from 1956 until 1961, when the newly formed UNC took over operations. It moved to a new facility in Montville in 1974 and decommissioned the original plant. Following the end of the cold war, the Montville facility was also shut down in 1990, with decontamination being completed in 1994.

Hematite, Missouri Production Plant 
UNC owned and operated the Hematite, Missouri reactor fuel production plant between 1961 and 1971. The facility was inherited from Mallinckrodt, one of three companies making up UNC. During its tenure, the company buried small quantities of uranium on the property; however the company failed to record or disclose specific information about the location, size, or makeup of the burials. In 1971, the facility was sold to the newly formed Gulf United Nuclear Fuels Corporation, a partnership between UNC and Gulf Oil. The site was sold to General Atomics in 1974, and again sold later that year to Combustion Engineering, who repurposed it into an enriched uranium fuel production plant for the U.S Navy.

In 1979 Combustion Engineering applied to decommission the site, however the proposal was rejected because decontamination and disposal activities were not included in the plan. Following this, several surveys were conducted during the 1980s to document the area's radiation exposure. The most notable of these was conducted in 1983 by the Radiation Management Corporation with the goal of discovering the sites Mallinckrodt and UNC had used to dispose of nuclear waste. The report found soil contamination at 40 times higher than the NRC's guidelines allow, and contamination in the ground water 1 to 12 times higher than the EPA allows. Despite this, the survey was unable to identify all burial sites.

The site was purchased in 2000 by the Westinghouse Electric Company and closed the next year. The decontamination and decommissioning of the facility was completed in 2016.

References 

1963 establishments in Maryland
1997 disestablishments in Maryland
Aviation companies
Chemical companies of the United States
Nuclear technology in the United States
Defense companies of the United States
General Electric acquisitions